Dolgorsürengiin Serjbüdee is a Mongolian retired professional wrestler, best known for his time with New Japan Pro-Wrestling (NJPW), where he wrestled under the ring name Blue Wolf. He also competed once in mixed martial arts in 2004, defeating fellow professional wrestler Tom Howard.

Professional wrestling career 
Dolgorsürengiin Serjbüdee is the brother of Dolgorsürengiin Sumyaabazar, a high ranking Mongolian 
traditional wrestler, and Asashōryū Akinori (Dolgorsürengiin Dagvadorj), a sumo yokozuna. Because of this fact, Serjbüdee received a large amount of press coverage when he became the first Mongolian professional wrestler when he joined New Japan Pro-Wrestling.

Serjbüdee made his debut during the 2001 G1 Climax tournament, facing Shinya Makabe. Having wrestled in amateur and sumo competitions since he was 15 years old, he showed immediate skill, strength and submission knowledge. Showing remarkable growth going into 2002, he was putting up good fights against established wrestling names. In January, 2002 he changed his ring name to Blue Wolf, which was similar to that of his brother's sumo name, Blue Dragon. This made it easier to promote Serjbüdee.

He joined Kensuke Sasaki's short-lived SWING-LOWS faction in July, 2002, which placed him into more feature matches. Even though he was often the loser in these matches, just the fact that he was even in such a position as a rookie was quite amazing. In 2006, Blue Wolf failed to renegotiate a contract with NJPW, however stating he would fight in the company without a contract. Blue Wolf has not yet been seen again in NJPW, pointing towards a return to Mongolia where he runs his own dojo.

In May 2004, Serjbüdee defeated fellow pro wrestler Tom Howard (aka "Green Beret") in an overwhelming mixed martial arts debut victory hosted by K-1.

Mixed martial arts record

|-
|Win
|align=center|1-0
| Tom Howard
|TKO (knees)
|K-1 MMA ROMANEX
|
|align=center|2
|align=center|4:44
|Saitama, Japan
|

Championships and accomplishments
New Japan Pro-Wrestling
Yuko Six Man Tag Team Tournament (2004) – with Shinsuke Nakamura and Katsuhiko Nakajima

References

External links
Profile at Strong Style Spirit
Profile at Purolove
Profile at Puroresu Central
 

1976 births
Heavyweight mixed martial artists
Mixed martial artists utilizing Bökh
Living people
Mongolian male mixed martial artists
Mongolian male professional wrestlers
Mongolian male sport wrestlers
People from Ulaanbaatar